The Eastern Punjab cricket team was an Indian domestic cricket team representing the eastern part of the Indian state of Punjab. It played 22 first-class matches, all in the Ranji Trophy, between 1950 and 1960, winning 2, losing 13 and drawing 7. It played its home matches in Amritsar and Jalandhar.

The highest individual score was 145 by Swaranjit Singh,
who hit two of the team’s four centuries. Swaranjit Singh’s 145 contributed to Eastern Punjab’s highest team total of 380. The lowest team total was 31, against Railways in 1958-59.

The best innings bowling figures were 6 for 35 by William Ghosh. The best match figures were 9 for 48 (5 for 15 and 4 for 33) by Som Prakash in Jammu and Kashmir’s inaugural first-class match in January 1960. That match, which Eastern Punjab won by an innings, was the only one in which they dismissed their opponents twice.

After the team disbanded, many of the players joined Southern Punjab or Northern Punjab, which both competed in the Ranji Trophy from 1960–61 and 1967-68. For the 1968-69 season they combined to form an undivided Punjab team.

See also
 Southern Punjab cricket team
 Patiala cricket team
 Northern Punjab cricket team

References

External links
First-class matches played by Eastern Punjab at CricketArchive

Indian first-class cricket teams
Former senior cricket clubs of India
Cricket in Punjab, India
1950 establishments in East Punjab
1960 disestablishments in India
Cricket clubs established in 1950